Chief Petty Officer (CPO) is the seventh enlisted rank (with the paygrade E-7) in the United States Navy and U.S. Coast Guard, just above Petty Officer First Class and below Senior Chief Petty Officer. The term "rating" is used to identify enlisted job specialties. In this way, enlisted personnel are segregated into three segments containing different enlisted ranks. Furthermore, rates are broken down into three levels: non-rated members without a designated occupation (E-1 through E-3). Advancement to E-4 and above is dependent on graduating from a specialty school that define what the enlisted is rated for. Petty officers (E-4 through E-6) and chief petty officers (E-7 through E-9) are part of the rated force and considered extremely knowledgeable about their particular rating. Examples include Culinary Services Chief and Aviation Maintenance Chief. The Chief Petty Officer is the rank. Gunners Mate is a rating. E7 is a pay grade. The term rating is used to identify the career field of a chief petty officer. For example, the title of a chief petty officer in the Master-at-Arms rating would be spoken or spelled out as Master-at-Arms, Chief Petty Officer or Chief Master-at-Arms. The title would be abbreviated MAC. The grade of chief petty officer was established on 1 April 1893 in the United States Navy. The United States Congress first authorized the Coast Guard to use the promotion to Chief Petty Officer on 18 May 1920. Chief petty officer is also the final cadet grade in the United States Naval Sea Cadet Corps.
  
Prior to 1958, chief petty officer was the highest enlisted grade in both the U.S. Navy and U.S. Coast Guard. In the U.S. Navy and U.S. Coast Guard, the new E-8 paygrade was called senior chief petty officer (SCPO) and the new E-9 paygrade master chief petty officer (MCPO), with the first selectees promoting to their respective grades in 1959 and 1960.

Prior to establishment of the E-8 and E-9 grades, chief petty officers could typically serve in uniform for 30 or more years.

Shortly following establishment of the E-8 and E-9 grades, service limits currently known as high year of tenure (HYT) were established by pay grade. Although these limits periodically flex based on Fleet manpower requirements, current HYT limits restrict chief petty officers not selected for promotion to senior chief petty officer to 24 years of service, after which they face mandatory retirement.

Similar limits of 26 years for senior chief petty officer and 30 years for master chief petty officer are currently used, with a smaller core of master chief petty officers serving in command, force, and fleet master chief petty officer positions in the Navy, and area master chief or the Coast Guard Reserve Force Master Chief in the Coast Guard, being eligible to remain in uniform for 32 to 35 years and with the Master Chief Petty Officer of the Navy and the Master Chief Petty Officer of the Coast Guard being permitted to remain in uniform until reaching 38 years of service.

Role

Navy chief petty officers serve a dual role as both technical experts and as leaders, with an increasing emphasis on leadership as they progress through the CPO paygrades. Like petty officers, every chief petty officer has both a rate (unlike the land and air services, rank only refers to commissioned officers in the U.S. Navy and U.S. Coast Guard) and a rating (i.e., job specialty, similar to an MOS in the U.S. Army and U.S. Marine Corps, or an AFSC in U.S. Air Force). A chief petty officer's full title is a combination of the two. Thus, a chief petty officer who has the rating of gunner's mate would be referred to as a chief gunner's mate (GMC).

Each rating has an official abbreviation, such as QM for quartermaster, BM for boatswain's mate, and FC for fire controlman. When combined with the Petty Officer level, this gives the short-hand for the Chief's rate, such as BMC for Chief Boatswain's Mate. It is not uncommon practice to refer to the Chief by this shorthand in all but the most formal correspondence (such as printing and inscription on awards). Usually, Chief Petty Officers are referred to in conversation as "Chief", regardless of their rating.

In the U.S. Navy, both commissioned officers and Chief Petty Officers are often colloquially referred to as "Khakis". In the past, commissioned officers and Chief Petty Officers wore khaki-colored uniforms both while on board seagoing vessels and ashore, as opposed to petty officers and seamen, who were referred to as deckplate sailors, or blueshirts. However, since 2009, while the khaki service uniform is still occasionally worn ashore, the U.S. Navy has progressed to utilizing a green/tan/black camouflage working uniform (NWU Type IIIs); replacing the daily wear of khaki service uniforms while on board vessels and ashore. During this time, a newly adopted service uniform for sailors in pay grades E-6 and below, consisting of a khaki shirt and black trousers was implemented. The latter has caused some discontent among some Chief Petty Officers and commissioned officers as a result. In the U.S. Coast Guard, petty officers, Chief Petty Officers, Warrant Officers, and commissioned officers all wear similar uniforms.

Uniquely among the U.S. uniformed services, a Coast Guard Chief Petty Officer may also serve as officer-in-charge of a unit. Such units may include small boat stations or detachments or a Marine Protector-class patrol boat.

Induction 

The Navy and Coast Guard are distinct among the U.S. Armed Forces in that promotion to the paygrade of E-7 traditionally has involved a set of specialized activities known collectively as "Initiation", "Orientation", "Induction" or most recently, "CPO 365 Phase II". The "Induction Season", as it was called, has been replaced by a program called CPO 365, a year-round program for first class petty officers. On January 7, 2013, the master chief petty officer of the Navy, Michael D. Stevens, announced:"Effective immediately, we're respectfully sun-downing the word 'induction', and in its place we'll use CPO 365 as the primary term. I believe that induction is more about a moment in time, and CPO 365 and the development of our FCPOs to become CPOs is not about a moment in time. It's about a continuous time. This is something we're going to do every day, 365 days a year, and so we want to make sure the term we are using is matching what we are doing."

On May 30, 2017, Master Chief Petty Officer of the Navy Steven Giordano announced:"The process creating Chief Petty Officers should once again be referred to as "Initiation". We are Initiating new Chief Petty Officers, and providing a roadmap for people to be successful in life — whatever the course."

Advancement 

Unlike petty officer first class and lower grades, advancement to chief petty officer not only carries requirements of time in service, superior evaluation scores, and specialty examinations, but also carries an added requirement of peer review. A chief petty officer can only advance after review by a selection board of serving senior and master chief petty officers, in effect "choosing their own".

Advancement into the chief petty officer grades is the most significant promotion within the enlisted naval grades. At the grade of chief petty officer, the Sailor takes on more administrative duties. In the Navy, their uniform changes to reflect this change of duty, becoming identical to that of an officer's uniform except with different insignia. Personnel in the three chief petty officer rates also have conspicuous privileges such as separate dining and living areas. Any naval vessel of sufficient size has a room or rooms that are off-limits to anyone not a chief (including commissioned officers), except by specific invitation. In naval jargon, this room is called the Chief's Mess. In addition, a chief petty officer is usually addressed by either their rate or as "Chief" by both subordinates and superiors upon advancement to the grade.

Deckplate leaders 
In naval terminology, the deckplate can roughly refer to the deck ("flooring"), or the area of the deck of a ship or boat (submarine). It can also refer to the Division Officer and chief petty officer leadership. The term deckplate leaders is a colloquial term referring to the senior enlisted personnel of the grade of chief petty officer and higher. They are generally charged with keeping good order and discipline within the lower enlisted grades.

Insignia and emblem 

Rate insignia in the Navy and Coast Guard are mostly identical. A chief petty officer's rate insignia is a perched eagle with spread wings (often affectionately referred to as a "crow") above three chevrons topped by a rocker. The rating emblem is displayed below the crow, within the area bordered by the rocker and the uppermost chevron. The chevrons and rocker are either red or gold. In the Navy enlisted members with at least 12 consecutive years of service in the armed forces wear gold chevrons. (Until 2019 the color would only change to gold if a sailor had a non-disciplinary record for this length of time.) The Coast Guard never had such rules; a Coast Guard chief petty officer's sleeve insignia is always gold, and rates below chief petty officer are always red.

On the dress blue uniform (and variants such as mess whites), the insignia is worn on the left arm of the uniform blouse (or "suit coat" in civilian terminology). On all other uniforms other than the Type III Navy Working Uniform, the insignia used is worn on the collar and has become universally accepted as the symbol of the chief petty officer, which is a fouled (entwined in the anchor chain) gold anchor superimposed with the letters "USN" in silver in the Navy, or a silver shield in the Coast Guard.

A U.S. Navy chief petty officer's rate emblem is symbolized by a fouled anchor with the letters "USN" centered on the anchor.

A U.S. Coast Guard chief petty officer's rate emblem is symbolized by a fouled anchor with a shield superimposed on its shank. The anchor is emblematic of "the chief" and represents stability and security. It serves to remind the chief petty officer of their responsibility to keep those they serve safe from harm's way. The significance of the shield date to the days of the Revenue Cutter Service when Congress added the shield to the ensign of the Cutter Service to distinguish cutters from other naval vessels. The chain is symbolic of flexibility and strength and serves to remind the chief petty officer that the chain of life is forged day-by-day, link-by-link. The chain also represents the reliance of one chief petty officer on another to get the job done and reminds him not to be the weak link in the chain. The chain fouled around the anchor represents "the Sailor's disgrace" and serves to remind chief petty officers that there may be times when circumstances are beyond their control in the performance of their duty, but a chief petty officer must complete the task.

See also
 List of United States Navy enlisted rates
 List of United States Coast Guard enlisted ranks

References

External links
History of the Chief Petty Officer Grade US Navy
The internet's virtual Chief's Mess - Goatlocker.org

Military ranks of the United States Navy
Military ranks of the United States Coast Guard
United States military enlisted ranks